Kovačevac (Cyrillic: Ковачевац) may refer to:

Kovačevac (Mladenovac), a village near Mladenovac, Serbia
Kovačevac (Jagodina), a village near Jagodina, Serbia
Kovačevac (Prijepolje), a village near Prijepolje, Serbia
Kovačevac (Kačanik), a village near Kačanik, Kosovo
Kovačevac (Jajce), Bosnia and Herzegovina
Kovačevac (Jezero), a village near Jezero, Bosnia and Herzegovina
Kovačevac (Busovača), a village near Busovača, Bosnia and Herzegovina
Kovačevac (Lipik), a village near Lipik, Croatia
Kovačevac (Rovišće), a village near Rovišće, Croatia
Kovačevac (Nova Gradiška), a village near Nova Gradiška, Croatia

See also
Kovač (disambiguation)
Kovači (disambiguation)
Kovačić (disambiguation)
Kovačići (disambiguation)
Kovačica (disambiguation)
Kovačice, a village
Kovačina, a village
Kovačevo (disambiguation)
Kovačevci (disambiguation)
Kovačevići (disambiguation)
Kováčová (disambiguation)
Kováčovce, a village